Jay Fai (also known as Raan Jay Fai 'Jay Fai's shop') is a street-side restaurant in Bangkok and a nickname of its eponymous owner, whose real name is Supinya Junsuta. The restaurant mainly serves wok-cooked seafood dishes, and is highly popular among food enthusiasts despite its high prices. It received one star in the inaugural Bangkok 2018 Michelin Guide.

History

Jay Fai was born c. 1945 to Chinese immigrant parents, who sold kuaitiao khua kai (chicken noodles) for a living. However, she was not good at cooking, and had to learn from her younger sister, who originally doubted her abilities. Jay Fai did not initially join the family business; instead, she worked as a seamstress for several years, until a fire prompted her to turn to cooking when she was in her thirties. She opened her restaurant in the 1980s and originally served congee and noodle dishes such as kuaitiao khua kai and rat na, building on her mother's recipes. She then gradually expanded her repertoire, experimenting and developing her own recipes and techniques. She also began using seafood, travelling extensively to procure better ingredients and charging accordingly. The restaurant gained a steady stream of followers, and has since become one of the most famous street-side restaurants in the city.

Operations
Jay Fai's restaurant occupies a shophouse on Maha Chai Road, in the neighbourhood known as Samran Rat or Pratu Phi in Bangkok's Phra Nakhon District. It is open-air and sparsely decorated, with green tiled walls and simple tables and stools for seating. Cooking takes place at the side of the shop, where the walls open onto a small alley, using two charcoal braziers. Jay Fai herself works six days a week as the restaurant's sole chef, wearing ski goggles while she cooks (the shop is closed on Sundays).

Jay Fai procures ingredients, especially seafood, directly from several sources, placing an emphasis on quality. This is reflected in her prices, which are much higher than regular street fare. One of her more famous dishes, for example, is a crab-meat omelette which costs upwards of 1,000 baht (over US$30). Other popular dishes include rat na and phat khi mao with seafood.

Reception

The restaurant has been famous among food enthusiasts for decades. In a 1999 review, Bangkok Post food critic Ung-aang Talay (Bob Halliday) described her as "one of those increasingly rare Mozarts of the noodle pan who can transform very ordinary, lunchtime-at-the-market dishes into masterpieces of local cuisine". Famous customers include Martha Stewart, who called Jay Fai "the best cook in Thailand".

In December 2017, the Michelin Guide released its inaugural 2018 edition for Bangkok, in which the restaurant was awarded one star. It was the only street restaurant to be awarded a star, and joins a handful of others in Hong Kong and Singapore as a result of Michelin's efforts to diversify its coverage, previously limited to fine dining establishments. The award resulted in a surge of customers for Jay Fai, who had never heard of the guide before and had to be persuaded to attend the ceremony. Following the announcement, the restaurant became so busy that it had to implement a reservations system (something she previously refused to do), and one of Jay Fai's daughters had to leave her job in order to help full-time (in addition to another, who already worked at the restaurant). In 2021, Jay Fai also won the Asia's 50 Best Restaurants Icon Award.

Jay Fai, who has never written down a recipe, has said that she does not intend to pass on the business, as she does not wish her children to pick up the hard work since it has earned enough.

Jay Fai was featured on the Netflix TV series, Street Food (TV series), in the Bangkok, Thailand episode. Many of her famous dishes were introduced, such as Tom Yum Soup, Dry Tom Yum and Crab Meat Omelette.

See also
 List of Thai restaurants

Notes

References

Michelin Guide starred restaurants in Thailand
Phra Nakhon district
Buildings and structures in Bangkok
Thai restaurants